Baisingen is a suburban district of Rottenburg am Neckar in the administrative district of Tübingen in Baden-Württemberg (Germany).

Geography 

Baisingen is located 15 km (9.32 mi) western from Rottenburg am Neckar, 8 km (4.97 mi) southeastern from Nagold and 12 km (7.45 mi) northeastern from Horb am Neckar. The elevation on the territory of Baisingen is 465 to 532 m.

Extent 

The territory of the district is 720 hectares. Thereof fall 79.5% upon agriculturally used area, 9.3% upon forest area, 10.8% upon settlement area and roads, 0.1% upon water area and 0.2% upon other.

Neighbour localities 

The territories of the following villages adjoin Baisingen, moving clockwise beginning in the north: Mötzingen1, Ergenzingen2, Göttelfingen3, Vollmaringen4. Ergenzingen is, like Baisingen, a district of Rottenburg.

1Böblingen (district);
2Tübingen (district);
3Freudenstadt (district);
4Calw (district)

Population 

Baisingen has a population of 1277 people (31/01/08). At an area of 7.20 km² (2.8 sq mi) this corresponds to a population density of 177 people per km², or 459 per sq mi.

Culture and Sights

Buildings 
The old synagogue of Baisingen has been restored.

References

External links 
 Official Webpage (German)

Rottenburg am Neckar